Thai Farmers Bank Football Club was a Thai football club based in Bangkok and was owned by Thai Farmers Bank. They won two AFC Champions League titles in 1994 and 1995.

Due to the 1997 Asian financial crisis, the club sponsor's stock price dropped 49%, which resulted in them being taken over by foreign investors. The financial crisis went on, so in 2000, the club folded.

Honours
AFC Champions League
Champions (2): 1993–94, 1994–95
Third place (1): 1995–96
Kor Royal Cup
Winners (5): 1991, 1992, 1993, 1995, 1999
Queen's Cup
Winners (4): 1994, 1995, 1996, 1997
Afro-Asian Club Championship
Champions (1): 1994
Thailand FA Cup
Winners (1): 1999

Performance in AFC competitions
Asian Club Championship: 5 appearances
1993: Qualifying – 3rd round
1994: Champion
1995: Champion
1996: 3rd place
1997: Second Round

Results

References

 
Defunct football clubs in Thailand
Association football clubs established in 1987
Association football clubs disestablished in 2000
Football clubs in Bangkok
Sport in Bangkok
1987 establishments in Thailand
2000 disestablishments in Thailand
Works association football clubs in Thailand
AFC Champions League winning clubs